Hey Santa! is a Christmas album recorded by Carnie & Wendy Wilson (SBK K2-27113). It was released in October 1993, and entered the Billboard Top Pop Albums chart on Christmas Day, 1993. The album was the first album recorded by the Wilson sisters after the group Wilson Phillips went on hiatus.

The album was not a commercial success, peaking at #116 on the Billboard Top Pop Albums chart, and reaching #25 on the Top Holiday Albums chart. The track listing for the album consists of eleven Christmas standards, plus the original title track, "Hey Santa!", written by the Wilson sisters and Jack Kugell.

The title track is about a man returning home to his love on Christmas, after his love wished that Santa would "bring [her] baby home tonight." SBK Records released one single to radio and retail. "Hey Santa!", backed with their cover version of "Have Yourself a Merry Little Christmas", was issued on cassette single and on a green vinyl 45 rpm, SBK S7-17648-A, and reached #22 on the Billboard Top Adult Contemporary chart. It also reached #1 on the Billboard Bubbling Under the Hot 100 chart, often shown as #101 on the Hot 100 in Billboard reference books. Despite being a commercial failure, the single still receives recurrent airplay during the Christmas holiday season. Carl Wilson, Carnie and Wendy's uncle and a Beach Boys founding member, features prominently in the backing vocal.

The album also features a Wilson family recording from 1976 of "I Saw Mommy Kissing Santa Claus" that features the Beach Boys on backing vocals and a wide range of Beach Boys band members' children, including Matthew and Adam Jardine, Hailey and Christian Love, and Jonah and Justyn Wilson.

Hey Santa! was later reissued with the same content and a two-page booklet without lyrics in 1999 with the catalog number 98289 by EMI/Capitol Special Markets on both CD and cassette. As of November 2007, this version of Hey Santa! is still available.

As of June 27, 2012, Hey Santa! has sold 138,747 copies in the U.S., according to SoundScan.

Other Christmas albums have followed a decade later. In 2007, Carnie Wilson released a solo Christmas album, Christmas with Carnie, that features new versions of many of the same songs. Then, in 2010, Wilson Phillips, back together in the music business as a group, released Christmas in Harmony, which also features new versions of a few songs used before.

Track listing
"Hey Santa!" (Jack Kugell; Carnie Wilson; Wendy Wilson)  -4:34
"Let It Snow! Let It Snow! Let It Snow!" (Jule Styne; Sammy Cahn)  -3:23
"Rudolph the Red Nosed Reindeer" (Johnny Marks)  -2:47
"Winter Wonderland" (Felix Bernard; Richard B. Smith)  -3:40
"Little Drummer Boy" (Katherine Kennicott Davis; Henry V. Oronati; Harry Simeone)  -4:17
"Have Yourself a Merry Little Christmas" (Ralph Blane; Hugh Martin)  -4:32
"Jingle Bell Rock" (Joseph Carleton Beal; James Ross Boothe)  -2:11
"Silver Bells" (Jay Livingston; Ray Evans)  -4:30
"Christmas Medley: We Three Kings of Orient Are/Silent Night/The First Noel" (Traditional)  -6:38
"I Saw Mommy Kissing Santa Claus" (Tommie Connor)  -1:14

External links

1993 Christmas albums
Wilson Phillips albums
Christmas albums by American artists
Pop Christmas albums
SBK Records albums
Songs about Santa Claus